Carl Yaya Priso (born 10 July 1979) is a French former professional footballer who played as a forward.

Career
His professional football career began in France with Poissy, moving on to Parisian side Red Star 93 and German side Chemnitzer FC in July 2004. He played just four times for Chemnitz in the Regionalliga before joining Italian side Magna Grecia in January 2005.

Leroy Rosenior signed him on a free transfer for Torquay United in August 2005 at the same time as two other French players, Morike Sako and Mamadoli Sow. His Torquay debut came on 13 August 2005 in a 3–0 defeat away to Mansfield Town. He made two more first team appearances before a foot injury kept him out of action. He was one of six players transfer-listed by Rosernior in October 2005 and was released by new manager Ian Atkins at the end of the 2005–06 season without making any further appearances for the Gulls.

In October 2007, Priso joined Crawley Town on trial, playing in their Sussex Senior Cup win. Later that month he had trials with Shrewsbury Town and Oxford United.

References

External links
 
 

Living people
1979 births
French footballers
Association football forwards
Regionalliga players
Championnat National 2 players
Championnat National 3 players
English Football League players
AS Poissy players
Red Star F.C. players
Torquay United F.C. players
Chemnitzer FC players
French expatriate footballers
French expatriate sportspeople in Germany
Expatriate footballers in Germany
French expatriate sportspeople in England
Expatriate footballers in England